Erythriastis rhodocrossa is a moth in the family Gelechiidae. It was described by Edward Meyrick in 1914. It is found in Guyana.

The wingspan is about 8 mm. The forewings are light greyish ochreous with the second discal stigma dark fuscous and with a series of small indistinct dark fuscous dots around the posterior part of the costa and termen, and a larger one at the tornus. The hindwings are rather dark grey.

References

Gelechiinae
Moths described in 1914